Inohara may refer to:
 7673 Inohara, a main-belt asteroid named after Japanese amateur astronomer Masanori Inohara (b. 1921)
 Junzo Inohara (1910–?), a Japanese hockey player